The Pennsylvania State Memorial is a monument in Gettysburg National Military Park that commemorates the 34,530 Pennsylvania soldiers who fought in the July 1 to 3, 1863 Battle of Gettysburg during the American Civil War. The memorial stands along Cemetery Ridge, the Union battle line on July 2, 1863. Completed in 1914, it is the largest of the state monuments on the Gettysburg Battlefield.

History

In the 1880s, Senator Andrew G. Curtin, who had served as Pennsylvania's governor during the Civil War, advocated for a "Pennsylvania Memorial Hall" to be built atop Little Round Top. The -square hall would display "a treasury of trophies and mementos of all the Pennsylvania regiments that fought at Gettysburg." The proposed building was included in an 1889 state appropriations bill, that was vetoed by Governor James A. Beaver.

Eighteen years later, the Pennsylvania Legislature appropriated $150,000 for construction of a state memorial, and the current site was announced in February 1909. The design competition for the commission was won by the entry of New York architect W. Liance Cottrell and Philadelphia sculptor Samuel Murray. The building was to be completed by July 1, 1910.

Humphreys Avenue, along the east side of the memorial, was not surveyed until 1911, so materials were delivered by railroad, via the Round Top Branch to nearby Hancock Station.

The memorial was unfinished when it was dedicated on September 27, 1910, and the project was out of money. An additional state appropriation of $40,000 was approved in 1911. The new completion date was set for July 1, 1913 – the 50th anniversary of the battle. The portrait statues were installed in April 1913, and the memorial was rededicated on July 4, 1913. A bronze tablet listing the names of 945 additional Pennsylvania veterans completed the memorial in 1914.

Description
The memorial features a square, granite pedestal (terrace) – 100 feet on each side – with bronze tablets on its exterior face that list the names of the 34,530 Pennsylvania soldiers who fought in the battle.<ref name=Beitler>{{Cite report |last=Beitler |first=Lewis Eugene (editor and compiler) |date=December 31, 1913 |title=Fiftieth Anniversary of the Battle of Gettysburg: Report of the Pennsylvania Commission |url=https://books.google.com/books?id=swkTAAAAYAAJ&pg=PA23 |format=Google Books |location=Harrisburg, Pennsylvania |publisher=Wm. Stanley Bay (state printer) |page=173 |access-date=2012-04-06 |quote="The Name of Every Pennsylvania Soldier Who Fought at Gettysburg is Recorded on These Bronze Tablets Adorning Her Memorial Monument.}} (p. 22b)</ref> Set upon the pedestal is the granite pavilion, which consists of 4 corner towers  linked by arches that form an arcus quadrifrons, or 4-sided triumphal arch. Engaged Ionic columns at the corners and flanking the arches form niches for the 8 portrait statues. The pavilion is topped by a granite dome. Between the parapet and the dome's base is an observation deck, accessed by a spiral staircase in the northwest corner tower. Under the pavilion is an undercroft or vaulted cellar. The memorial's entrance is on the west (Hancock Avenue) side, where a wide flight of steps rises to the pedestal's terrace. Half-flights rise beneath each arch into the pavilion's central hall.

A bronze Nike figure, the Goddess of Victory and Peace, crowns the podium atop the dome. She holds a sword in one hand and a palm branch, a symbol of victory through peace, in the other. In a gesture to the Biblical passage "they shall beat their swords into plowshares," the bronze used to cast the Nike came from melted-down cannons. Above the arches are spandrel bas-reliefs of winged goddesses, and above the cornice is a parapet with a bas-relief panel on each side that depicts the Artillery, Cavalry, Infantry and Signal Corps. Larger-than-life bronze statues of President Abraham Lincoln and other prominent Civil War figures flank the arches. Above them are bas-relief shields and laurel wreaths. The names of important figures in the battle are inscribed across the pavilion's frieze and on its interior.

Sculpture
 
 Goddess of Victory and Peace (1909–10) by Samuel Murray, atop the monument's dome. Height: 21 ft (6.4 m). Weight: 7,500 lb (3,402 kg).
 Portrait statues:
 President Abraham Lincoln (1911–1913) by J. Otto Schweizer, west side
 Governor Andrew Curtin (1911–1913) by William Clark Noble, west side
 General George Meade (1911–1913) by Lee Lawrie, north side
 General John F. Reynolds (1911–1913) by Lee Lawrie, north side
 General Winfield Scott Hancock (1911–1913) by Cyrus Edwin Dallin, south side
 General David McMurtrie Gregg (1911–1913) by J. Otto Schweizer, east side
 General Alfred Pleasonton (1911–1913) by J. Otto Schweizer, south side
 General David B. Birney (1911–1913) by Lee Lawrie, south side

Architectural sculpture
 4 white marble parapet bas-relief panels: 
 Artillery (1909–10) by Samuel Murray, north parapet.
 Cavalry (1909–10) by Samuel Murray, south parapet.
 Infantry (1909–10) by Samuel Murray, west parapet. Pennsylvania Bucktails of Stone's Brigade at the McPherson Farm.
 Signal Corps (1909–10) by Samuel Murray, east parapet.
 Attendants to Victory'', 8 white marble bas-relief goddess figures (1909–10) by Samuel Murray, a pair in the spandrels above each arch.
 8 white marble Shield & Laurel Wreath bas-reliefs (1909–10) by Samuel Murray, one in the niche above each portrait statue.

Regimental memorials
The perimeter wall features 75 bronze plaques memorializing Pennsylvania units during the war.

Maintenance
In 1921, the dome was lined with steel and sealed by William D. Gilbert and James Weikert  and in 1929, the monument's copper was relined and defective woodwork was replaced.  The nearby comfort station was completed in 1933 as the first "Gettysburg Parkitecture" structure using Gettysburg granite as in native colonial structures.  A 1941 memorial bench  of marble in front of the monument was broken by "unknown culprits" in 1952, and a marble bench was smashed in 1994.

Images

See also

Gettysburg Battlefield Historic District
List of monuments of the Gettysburg Battlefield
Searchable database of names on the Pennsylvania Monument

References

Gettysburg Battlefield monuments and memorials
Outdoor sculptures in Pennsylvania
Pavilions in the United States
Triumphal arches in the United States
1911 sculptures
Buildings and structures completed in 1911
Beaux-Arts architecture in Pennsylvania
1911 establishments in Pennsylvania